Oued Zem is a city in Khouribga Province, Béni Mellal-Khénifra, Morocco. According to the 2014 Moroccan census, Oued Zem had a population of 95,267.

Wadi Zem is a Moroccan city located in central Morocco, in the Chaouia-Ouardigha region in the Khouribga province, on an area of 75,000 hectares between the axis of Casablanca, Beni Mellal and between the axis of Rabat, Marrakech, with a population of 83,970 people (2004 census). The city is rich in phosphate, iron and marble. The first railway was erected there in 1917, during the discovery of phosphate for the first time in Morocco by the colonizer at the time to export it abroad. The French called Wadi Zem in Little Paris, and they built a lake in the shape of a map of France, which is still to this day. The city played a major role in Morocco's independence thanks to the ferocity of its resistance.

Notable people 
Jannat, Moroccan-Egyptian singer.

References

Populated places in Khouribga Province